Renzo Andrés Reggiardo Barreto (born 1 July 1972) is a Peruvian politician from Popular Renewal, businessman and a former Congressman representing the constituency of Lima for two terms, between 2006 and 2016. In 2018, he ran unsuccessfully for Mayor of Lima in the local elections. Leading most of the polls throughout the entire campaign, his absence in the mayoral debate caused him to finish in third place in the election with 8.9% of the popular vote, losing to Jorge Muñoz Walls of the Popular Action.

Biography 
He is the son of the Italian-Peruvian Fujimorist politician Andrés Reggiardo. He graduated from the University of San Martín de Porres. A fact that aroused public and media attention was the criminal attack suffered by his wife and daughter, when they left their congressional office on August 4, 2011. After the events, he was elected as president of the new special commission on Citizen Security in Congress.

Political career

Early political career 
He joined his father's party Cambio 90 which was founded by his father and former President Alberto Fujimori and served as its National secretary of its youth branch from 2006 to 2010. In May 2010, he became the National secretary of Cambio 90.

Congressional career 
In the 2006 general elections, Reggiardo was elected to the Congress for the 2006–2011 term, representing the city of Lima on the Fujimorist Alliance for the Future. When the ex-president's daughter Keiko Fujimori decided to form a new party, Force 2011, to promote her presidential candidacy for the 2011 presidential elections, Reggiardo did not follow. Instead, he added what was left of Cambio 90 to the National Solidarity Alliance and endorsed former Lima Mayor Luis Castañeda for the presidency. In the congressional vote, Reggiardo was re-elected in the constituency of Lima and as the only congressman from Cambio 90. Instead of joining with the rest of the representatives elected on the alliance's lists, Reggiardo now sits on the Parliamentary Coordination bench, together with the Peruvian Aprista Party's lawmakers and Carlos Bruce.

Post-congressional career

2016 presidential campaign 
In the 2016 presidential elections, he ran for President under the Peru Secure Homeland party, the successor of Cambio 90, but he withdrew from the race, as he claimed lack of credibility in the electoral process.

2018 Lima mayoral election 
Two years later in 2018, Reggiardo unsuccessfully ran for Mayor of Lima in the 2018 local elections. Leading most of the polls throughout the entire campaign, his absence in the mayoral debate caused him to finish in third place in the election with 8.9% of the popular vote, losing to Jorge Muñoz Walls of the Popular Action.

References

External links 

Official Congressional Site
Resume on the National Electoral Committee (JNE) site

1972 births
Living people
Popular Renewal politicians
People from Lima
Peruvian people of Italian descent
Members of the Congress of the Republic of Peru
21st-century Peruvian politicians
University of San Martín de Porres alumni